Barbara Robinson may refer to:

Barbara Robinson (author) (1927–2013), American children's writer
Barbara A. Robinson (born 1938), member of the Maryland House of Delegates
Barbara Paul Robinson, New York City lawyer
Barbara Robinson (producer) (born 1960), American film producer and studio executive